Marginal vein man refer to:

In the heart
 Left marginal vein (vena marginalis sinistra)
 Right marginal vein (vena marginalis dextra)

In the foot
 Lateral marginal vein (vena marginalis lateralis pedis)
 Medial marginal vein (vena marginalis medialis pedis)